Nathaniel Ledbetter (born c. 1961) is an American politician who has served as the Speaker of the Alabama House of Representatives since 2023. He represents Alabama's 24th House district, which includes parts of DeKalb County, since his election in 2014. He was the mayor of Rainsville, Alabama until 2002. In March 2017, he succeeded Micky Hammon as the majority leader in the House of Representatives. Ledbetter was elected Speaker of the House in January 2023, succeeding Mac McCutcheon.

References

|-

1961 births
21st-century American politicians
Living people
Mayors of places in Alabama
People from DeKalb County, Alabama
Republican Party members of the Alabama House of Representatives